Hossein Ghods-Nakhaï (‎; GCVO 1894–1977) was an Iranian politician, cabinet minister, diplomat, and poet.

Early life
He was the son of the Iranian clerk, Hajj Agha Hasan Nakhai. His brother was Muhammad Nakhaï, who served as the Secretary of Persian Legation in Brussels starting in 1928. Like his father, Hossein's surname was initially Nakhaï. In his youth, he was the editor of a literature magazine, called Ghods, and so became known as "Mr. Ghods" to everyone. He then added the word Ghods to his surname. He was married to the daughter of the first Iranian ambassador to U.S., Sadr es-Saltaneh, also known as Haji Washington.

Diplomatic and political career
He held the position of the minister of foreign affairs between 1961 and 1963. Before that he was ambassador to Baghdad, London, Tokyo (October 1956 to January 1958), and to Washington, D.C. (in the 1960s, during John F. Kennedy administration). Afterwards, he was appointed as the minister of the royal court, a post he held until 1968. He was replaced as the minister of court by Amir Assadollah Alam. Afterwards, he became the ambassador to the Holy See (Vatican).

He was the chairman of the committee that negotiated with the USSR on return to Iranian gold deposited with the government of the Tsar.

Literary life
Nakhaï wrote extensive volumes of poetry (including his Rubaiyat), and prose (including "Trail lost in heaven"). Some of his works have been translated into English and other languages.

References

External links 
 , he can be seen behind president Kennedy

20th-century Iranian politicians
20th-century poets
1894 births
1977 deaths
Ambassadors of Iran to Iraq
Ambassadors of Iran to Japan
Ambassadors of Iran to the United Kingdom
Ambassadors of Iran to the United States
Ambassadors of Iran to the Holy See
Foreign ministers of Iran
People from Sari, Iran